The 1924 United States presidential election in Louisiana took place on November 4, 1924, as part of the 1924 United States presidential election, which was held throughout all contemporary forty-eight states. Voters chose ten representatives, or electors to the Electoral College, who voted for president and vice president.

Louisiana was won easily by John W. Davis of West Virginia over incumbent president Calvin Coolidge. It was the only state where Progressive nominee Robert M. La Follette of Wisconsin was not on the ballot, although it is known that there were write-in votes cast for him. With 76.44 percent of the popular vote, Louisiana was, as was typical at this height of the “Solid South”, Davis’ third-strongest state behind South Carolina and Mississippi.

Results

Results by parish

See also
 United States presidential elections in Louisiana

References

Louisiana
1924
1924 Louisiana elections